The noble House of the Sarlo  descends directly from Sarlo the I, son of Tancred de Hauteville and his first wife Muriella. Sarlo the first had a son from his marriage with the daughter of the Lord of Pirou also called  Sarlo. Sarlo II went in the Mezzogiorno (south of Italy) with his uncles to seek fortune.

The Sarlo have Marquise title and are one of the most ancient families of Reggio Calabria's aristocracy (The name Sarlo is to be often found in the form Serlo, Serlon, or Serlonis used from its Latin forms).

In the 16th century the Baron Don Octavius Sarlo Utrusque Jure Doctore (U.J.D. - Doctor in both Cesar and Canonical Laws) Nobel Patrician of Reggio Calabria and of Mileto (City in Calabria having been the first Capital of the Norman Kingdom in the Mezzogiorno), was Lord Major of the Nobles of Reggio Calabria from 1592 to 1593.

This Noble House had many doctor in Laws (U.J.D.) further than men of arms (High Rank officials in the Army) and Ecclesiastics. One of the Sarlo was one of the 14 Aristocrats of Reggio Calabria founding the Noble Brotherhood of Saint Dominic. They were Land Lords until feudality subversion in the 1806 during the Reign of King Murat. In our days the principal representative of this ancient House are Knights of the Sovereign Military Order of Malta.

Coat of arms

Azure, at the abased red fess, with or lion rampant surmounted by three argent mullets of eight points wrongly ordered in chief, at the natural weaved Sea in peak.

Bibliography
Kenneth Baxter Wolf, The Deeds of Count Roger of Calabria and Sicily and of His Brother Duke Robert Guiscard, Translation of GOFFREDO MALATERRA, De Rebus Gestis Rogerii Calabriae et Siciliae Comitis et Roberti Guiscardi Ducis Fratris Eius, Published by University of Michigan Press, 2005;
JOHN JULIUS NORWICH, The Normans in the South (1016–1130), Longmans, Green and Co. Ltd, Publishers, London, 1967;
LEON-ROBERT MÉNAGER, Inventaire des familles normandes et franques émigrées en Italie méridionale et en Sicilie (XIe-XIIe siècles), Variorum Reprints, London, 1981;
GAETANO CINGARI, Reggio Calabria, Laterza publisher, Bari, Italy, 1988;
AGUSTO PLACANICA, Storia della Calabria dall’antichità ai giorni nostri, Donizzelli publisher, Rom, Italy, 1999;
Libro d'Oro della Nobiltà Italiana, Heraldik College (Collegio Araldico), Roman Heraldik Institute (Istituto Araldico Romano), 2010–2014, XXIV Edition, Part I - M-Z, pages 593–595;

Categories

de Hauteville
Sarlo I of Hauteville
Sarlo II of Hauteville
Reggio Calabria Notable people

Italian noble families